Bolandu (also Romanized as Bolandū; also known as Boland) is a village in Javid-e Mahuri Rural District, in the Central District of Mamasani County, Fars Province, Iran. At the 2006 census, its population was 111, in 25 families.

It is situated in the mountains at an elevation of approximately 2,000 meters above sea level and is surrounded by forests and fertile fields. The village has a population of around 1,000 people and is predominantly inhabited by ethnic Persians.

The main economic activity in Bolandu, Fars is agriculture. The village is located in a region that has a long history of agriculture, and many of its residents work as farmers or herders. The village is known for producing a variety of crops, including wheat, barley, and vegetables, as well as raising livestock such as cows, goats, and sheep.

In addition to agriculture, Bolandu, Fars is also known for its handicrafts. The village has a long tradition of producing beautiful and intricate carpets, baskets, and pottery using traditional techniques. These handicrafts are highly prized and are often sold both within the village and in other parts of the country.

Despite its small size, Bolandu, Fars has a number of important cultural and religious institutions. The village is home to several mosques, as well as a number of schools and community centers. These institutions play a vital role in maintaining the traditions and cultural identity of the village and are an important part of daily life in Bolandu, Fars.

References 

Populated places in Mamasani County